The Battle of Lesmont was a battle of the War of the Sixth Coalition. It took place at Lesmont in Aube on 2 February 1814. A Coalition force of Russians and Bavarians under generals Eugen of Wurtemberg and Carl Philipp von Wrede was defeated by a French force under general Joseph Lagrange, which managed to destroy the town's bridge and prevent the Coalition force crossing the river Aube.

Background
After the battle of La Rothière on 1 February 1814, Napoleon ordered a retreat towards Troyes and placed some of Michel Ney's troops as well as Joseph Lagrange's division from marshal Marmont's corps as his rearguard.

Battle
The French army crossed the bridge at Lesmont on the night of 2 February protected by troops under Ney's command, who then retired. Lagrange's division remained in the village to cover the retreat and took up position on the right bank of the river behind the bridge. It was soon attacked by Eugen's cavalry and elements of von Wrede's corps.

Lagrange's division managed to hold its central position against several attacks, especially by Eugen's Russian cavalry. At the end of the battle the French troops set fire to the bridge and rejoined the main retreating force.

Aftermath
The loss of the bridge meant that the Coalition cavalry lost contact with the French troops, which reached Troyes the following day without incident. There Napoleon gathered his army and re-took the offensive, beating the Russians at the battle of Champaubert on 10 February.

Notes

References

External links

Battles of the War of the Sixth Coalition
Battles of the Napoleonic Wars
Battles involving Bavaria
Battles involving France
Battles involving Russia
Conflicts in 1814
February 1814 events
1814 in France